Sakamaki is a Japanese surname. Notable people with the surname include:
 Kazuo Sakamaki (1928-1999), Japanese naval officer and first prisoner of World War II in the USA
 Shunzo Sakamaki (1906-1973), Japanese-American professor of Japanese studies
 Sakamaki family, several fictitious characters in the visual novel franchise Diabolik Lovers

Japanese-language surnames